Igor Outkine (aka Randy K) (born 1964 in Soviet Union) is an acoustic and midi accordionist and vocalist. His vocal and instrumental repertoire covers an extremely wide range of music such as classical and opera, Neapolitan song, Argentine and Russian tango, jazz and pop.

He studied classical accordion at Elektrostal's music college and traditional singing at the Gnesin Institute in Moscow. He performed extensively with several folk groups and with the Rozovsky Theatre of Moscow. He came to London in 1990 with the gypsy band Loyko and has continued to perform the music of his homeland in various venues.

In 2004 he appeared in Almeida Theatre in London with Soft Cell lead singer Marc Almond playing and singing Russian songs and is featured on Almond's live DVD Sin Songs.

He has played on several major film soundtracks including The Man Who Knew Too Little, Birthday Girl, MirrorMask, La Vie en Rose and La Môme. Outkine also appears on screen in the David Cronenberg film Eastern Promises, singing the Russian folk song "Dark Eyes". He appeared on ITV’s Britain Got Talent in 2019 performing a pop medley.

In 1996, Igor Outkine formed a music duo with English violinist Sarah Harrison called Mazaika. Their extensive repertoire consists of Russian folk and Gypsy music, Russian and Argentinian tango, classical virtuoso showpieces, opera highlights, Neapolitan songs and French chanson, Hotclub jazz and Outkine's original compositions, which always have a strong improvisational element.

References
[ Credits] at Allmusic
[ Credits] at Allmusic
Mazaika in Edinburgh Festival 2006 Guide

External links

Mazaika Duo official site

Living people
1964 births
21st-century accordionists